IAP may refer to:

Medicine

 Intra-abdominal pressure

Organizations

 Adventist Church of Promise (Portuguese: Igreja Adventista da Promessa), evangelical Christian church based in Brazil
 Fraunhofer Institute for Applied Polymer Research, a German institute operated by the Fraunhofer Society
 Independent American Party of Nevada, the Nevada Constitution Party affiliate
 Information Age Publishing, American academic publisher in Charlotte, North Carolina
 Institut d'astrophysique de Paris (Paris Astrophysical Institute), a French scientific organization
 Institution of Analysts and Programmers, an international institution for professions involved in the analysis, development and testing of software
 Integrated Applications Promotion, a European Space Agency programme for developing applications of space-based technology
 InterAcademy Panel, an international organization for cooperation of science academies
 International Academy of Pathology, an international organization dedicated to the advancement of Pathology through educational exchanges worldwide.
 International Association of Prosecutors, a non-governmental organisation established by the United Nations in 1995
 Irish Academic Press, independent Irish academic publisher based in Newbridge, County Kildare
 Islamic Association of Palestine, a defunct Islamic fund-raising organization  
 Italian African Police  (Polizia dell'Africa Italiana), the police force of Italian-controlled areas in Africa in 1936-1941

Science and technology
 Identical ancestors point, a point in time in the past where every living member of a species at that time is either an ancestor to all living of that species or none living
 Identity-Aware Proxy, part of the Google Cloud Platform, that uses identity and context to guard access to your applications and VMs
 Imaging atom probe
 In-app purchase, a way of purchasing virtual goods in mobile applications
 In-application programming, a way to program computer logic devices while they are being operated by the system
 Indanylaminopropane, an uncommon psychoactive chemical sometimes compared to MDMA
 Index of air purity, a measure of air quality
 Inhibitor of apoptosis, a protein family involved in the suppression of programmed cell death (apoptosis)
 Integrated automation platform
 Integrin Associated Protein or CD47 protein
 Internet access provider, also known as an Internet service provider
 Intrapartum antibiotic prophylaxis, for Group B streptococcal infection
 IPTV Application Platform, an IPTV application platform from Ericsson
 Indoor Air Pollution Indoor air quality
 Intracisternal A particle, a retrotransposable element subfamily linked to epigenetic variability

Transportation
 Instrument approach procedure, a published procedure for the final approach for landing at an airport under instrument flight rules
 International airport

Other uses
 Independent Activities Period, held at MIT every year immediately after winter vacation
 The Italian Asphalt & Pavement Company, a former name of the American musical group The Duprees

See also
 IAPS (disambiguation)